The Viñita Formation is a geological formation in Coquimbo, Chile, whose strata date back to the Late Cretaceous (Santonian to Maastrichtian). Dinosaur remains are among the fossils that have been recovered from the formation.

Vertebrate paleofauna 
 Antarctosaurus wichmannianus
 Lithostrotia indet. (Titanosaurus indet.)

See also 
 List of dinosaur-bearing rock formations

References

Further reading 
 R. M. Casamiquela, J. Corvalán, and F. Franquesa. 1969. Hallazgos de dinosaurios en el Cretácico Superior de Chile. Su importancia cronológica-estratigráfica [Discoveries of dinosaurs in the Upper Cretaceous of Chile. Their chronologic-stratigraphic importance]. Boletin del Instituto de Investigaciones Geológicas 25:1-31

Geologic formations of Chile
Upper Cretaceous Series of South America
Cretaceous Chile
Paleontology in Chile
Sandstone formations
Shale formations
Geology of Coquimbo Region